František Gregor (December 8, 1938 in Bratislava – March 10, 2013) was an ice hockey defenceman.

During his career, Gregor played for HC Slovan Bratislava, HC Dukla Jihlava and HC Košice. He also played for the Czechoslovak national team and won a bronze medal at the 1964 Winter Olympics.

References

External links 
 

1938 births
2013 deaths
Ice hockey players at the 1964 Winter Olympics
Olympic ice hockey players of Czechoslovakia
Czechoslovak ice hockey defencemen
Olympic medalists in ice hockey
Olympic bronze medalists for Czechoslovakia
Slovak ice hockey defencemen
Medalists at the 1964 Winter Olympics
HC Dukla Jihlava players
HC Slovan Bratislava players
HC Košice players
Ice hockey people from Bratislava